The 2018 Trinidad and Tobago League Cup (known for sponsorship reasons as the 2018 First Citizens Cup) was the nineteenth season of the First Citizens Cup, which is the league cup competition for Trinidad and Tobago teams competing in the TT Pro League and will run from the 8 June to 20 July. W Connection entered as the cup holders having defeated Defence Force by a score of 3–1 in the 2017 final. The cup underwent a format change where the clubs were divided into 2 groups of 5 teams. The teams would play each other once on a round-robin basis and the top 2 teams from each group would advance to the semifinals.

Group stage

In the group stage, each teams played each other twice round-robin basis. The top 2 teams from each group advanced to the semifinals.

Group Immortelle

Group Abercrombie

Semifinals

Final

Season statistics

Top scorers

References

Trinidad and Tobago League Cup